Julio García Mera (born 27 May 1972) is a former Spanish futsal player, best known for his spell with Inter Movistar as a defender.

Honours

Interviú
5 LNFS Champion 95-96 01-02 02-03 03-04 and 04-05
1 LNFS Vice-Champion 94-95
4 LNFS Futsal Cup Winner 95-96 00-01 03-04 and 04-05
3 LNFS Futsal Cup Vice-Champion 96-97 98-99 and 02-03
5 LNFS Super Cup Winner 90-91, 96-97 01-02 02-03 and 03-04
1 European Champions Cup 3rd place 96-97
1 UEFA Futsal Cup 03-04
1 "Copa Iberica" 03-04
1 Intercontinental Cup 05

Spain
FIFA World Champion Guatemala 2000
FIFA World Vice-Champion Spain 1996
UEFA European Champion Cordoba-Spain 1996, Moscow-Russia 2001 and Czech Rep. 2005
UEFA European Vice Champion Granada-Spain 1999
Four Nations Cup Winner Spain 1994, Netherlands 1997

External links
FutsalPlanet.com

1972 births
Living people
Sportspeople from Madrid
Spanish men's futsal players
Futsal defenders
Inter FS players